Katzelmacher is a 1969 West German film directed by Rainer Werner Fassbinder, based on his own play. The film centers on an aimless group of friends whose lives are shaken up by the arrival of an immigrant Greek worker, Jorgos (played by Fassbinder himself, in an uncredited role).

Cast 
 Hanna Schygulla: Marie
 Lilith Ungerer: Helga
 Rudolf Waldemar Brem: Paul
 Elga Sorbas: Rosy
 Doris Mattes: Gunda
 Irm Hermann: Elisabeth
 Peter Moland: Peter
 Hans Hirschmüller: Erich
 Rainer Werner Fassbinder: Jorgos
 Harry Baer: Franz
 Hannes Gromball: Klaus
 Katrin Schaake: Woman

External links

1969 films
1960s avant-garde and experimental films
1969 drama films
German avant-garde and experimental films
German drama films
Films about immigration
Films about race and ethnicity
Films based on works by Rainer Werner Fassbinder
Films directed by Rainer Werner Fassbinder
West German films
German black-and-white films
Films set in Munich
1960s German films